The 2020 Saint Barthélemy Championships are the 17th season of the competition. Per obtained statistics, the competitions began sometime in early to mid 2020, and as of 17 November 2020, about 7 matches have been played. It is unclear how the COVID-19 pandemic affected the competition. 

The competitions are broken into several mini cups and tournament. The only known competition that was played during the season was the 2020 edition of the Trophée José da Silva, or the Coupe de Noël.

Clubs  
Eight clubs participated in the season. 

 Arawak
 Arawak Veterans
 ASPSB
 ASPSB Féminines
 ASPSB Veterans
 Diables Rouges
 Gustavia
 FWI

Trophée José da Silva

Group stage

References 

Saint Barthélemy football competitions
Saint Barthélemy Championships
Ligue